Jean-Michel Fontaine (born 28 August 1988) is a Réunionese footballer. He primarily plays as a forward and is Réunion's all-time top scorer.

In February 2013 he joined Fleetwood Town, before being released at the end of the season.

International career

International goals

Scores and results list Réunion's goal tally first, score column indicates score after each Fontaine goal.

See also 
 List of top international men's football goalscorers by country

References

External links
 

1988 births
Living people
People from Saint-Pierre, Réunion
Réunion international footballers
Footballers from Réunion
Fleetwood Town F.C. players
Association football forwards